Edgardo "Edgar" Díaz Díaz (born April 18, 1968) is a former pole vaulter from Puerto Rico. He competed for his native country in two consecutive Summer Olympics, starting in 1992. He is also a two-time gold medalist at the Central American and Caribbean Games of 1993 and 1998.

Achievements

References

1968 births
Living people
Puerto Rican male pole vaulters
Olympic track and field athletes of Puerto Rico
Athletes (track and field) at the 1992 Summer Olympics
Athletes (track and field) at the 1996 Summer Olympics
Pan American Games competitors for Puerto Rico
Athletes (track and field) at the 1991 Pan American Games
Athletes (track and field) at the 1995 Pan American Games
Athletes (track and field) at the 1999 Pan American Games
Central American and Caribbean Games gold medalists for Puerto Rico
Competitors at the 1993 Central American and Caribbean Games
Competitors at the 1998 Central American and Caribbean Games
Central American and Caribbean Games medalists in athletics